Gina Marie Tolleson (born March 26, 1969) is an American model and beauty queen who was crowned Miss World America 1990 and also Miss World 1990.

Miss World
Gina won the title of Miss South Carolina USA 1990 and was the first runner-up at Miss USA 1990. She went on to win the Miss World beauty pageant in 1990, representing the United States. Gina was coached by C.B. Mathis of CB's Limited in Lancaster, SC. During her reign, she traveled to over twenty countries including  United Kingdom, Germany, Canada, Dominican Republic, South Africa, Poland, Belize, El Salvador, Guatemala and throughout the United States.

Personal life
Gina married the late Canadian-American actor Alan Thicke (Growing Pains) on August 13, 1994 and divorced him on September 29, 1999. She has a son with Thicke named Carter William. She has two other children born 2005 and 2006, with her second husband Christian Wiesenthal.

References 

Living people
Miss World 1990 delegates
Miss World winners
People from Spartanburg, South Carolina
Miss USA 1990 delegates
1969 births
20th-century American people